Frederick Chalkley (born ) was an English footballer who played as a full-back for Thames Ironworks, the club that would later become known as West Ham United.

Born in Plaistow, Essex, Chalkley played for local team Park Grove, becoming club captain in 1893–94, before joining Thames Ironworks in August 1896. He played in the first game of the season, against Queens Park Rangers, but did not earn a permanent place until November 1896 from when he did not miss a game for the rest of the season. He lost his place in November 1897 and was relegated to playing for the second team. He made three FA Cup appearances for the club during the 1897–98 season.

In 1898, Chalkley left the Irons for London League side Monsteds Athletic. He also played for Clapton Orient, who later became known as Leyton Orient.

References

1875 births
Year of death missing
Footballers from Plaistow, Newham
English footballers
Association football fullbacks
Thames Ironworks F.C. players
Leyton Orient F.C. players